Osteolepiformes, also known as Osteolepidida, is a group of prehistoric lobe-finned fishes which first appeared during the Devonian period. The order contains the families Canowindridae, Megalichthyidae, Osteolepididae and Tristichopteridae. The order is generally considered to be paraphyletic because the characters that define it are mainly attributes of stem tetrapodomorphs.

Below is a cladogram showing the paraphyly of Osteolepiformes compiled and modified from Ahlberg and Johanson (1998). See also Swartz (2012). Osteolepiformes is marked by the green bracket.

References

External links
Tree of Life

Tetrapodomorphs
Prehistoric fish orders
Paraphyletic groups